Francesco Macchietto (31 July 1932 – 8 September 2011) was an Italian ice hockey player. He competed in the men's tournaments at the 1956 Winter Olympics and the 1964 Winter Olympics.

References

External links
 

1932 births
2011 deaths
Ice hockey players at the 1956 Winter Olympics
Ice hockey players at the 1964 Winter Olympics
Olympic ice hockey players of Italy
People from Belluno
Sportspeople from the Province of Belluno